Simon Norfolk (born 1963) is a Nigerian-born British architectural and landscape photographer. He has produced four photo book monographs of his work. His photographs are held in over a dozen public museum collections.

Life and work
Norfolk was born in Nigeria but was raised in England. Norfolk studied documentary photography at Newport College of Art. He lives and works in Brighton & Hove and Kabul.

Norfolk has won the Prix Dialogue de l'Humanite award at Rencontres d'Arles, multiple World Press Photo and Sony World Photography Awards, the Foreign Press Club of America Award, European Publishers Award for Photography and an Infinity Prize from International Center of Photography. In 2003 he was shortlisted for the Citibank Prize (now known as the Deutsche Börse Photography Prize), and in 2013 he won the Prix Pictet Commission. His works have been collected by the Museum of Fine Arts, Houston and Tate Modern, London.

Books
For Most of It I Have No Words: Genocide, Landscape, Memory. Stockport: Dewi Lewis, 1998. .
Afghanistan. Stockport: Dewi Lewis, 2002. .
Afghanistan: Chronotopia.
Stockport: Dewi Lewis, 2002. .
Stockport: Dewi Lewis, 2005.
Bleed. Stockport: Dewi Lewis, 2005. .
Burke + Norfolk: Photographs from the War in Afghanistan by John Burke and Simon Norfolk. Stockport: Dewi Lewis, 2011. . Photographs by Norfolk and John Burke.
Full Spectrum Dominance. Self-published. Edition of 95 copies.

Awards
2001: World Press Photo.
2002: European Publishers Award for Photography.
2003: Citibank Prize, shortlisted.
2003: Overseas Press Club of America, Olivier Rebbot Award.
2004: Infinity Prize, International Center of Photography.
2005: Prix Dialogue de l'Humanite award, Rencontres d'Arles.
2012: World Press Photo, Portraits.
2012: Sony World Photography Awards, Professional Competition, People, 1st place.
2012: Association of Photographers, Gold Award, Non-commissioned Project.
2013: Prix Pictet Commission.
2015: Sony World Photography Awards, Professional Competition, Landscape, 1st place.
2015: LensCulture Earth Awards, Series Winner, Fine Art / Conceptual.
2016: British Archaeological Awards, Best Public Presentation (for "Under London," National Geographic Magazine)
2020 Shifting Foundation Grant

Exhibitions

Solo exhibitions 
For most of it I have no words. Side Gallery, Newcastle. June–August 1999.

Group exhibitions
Afghanistan: Chronotopia, part of The Citibank Prize, The Photographers' Gallery, London, 2003.
Prix Pictet Commission photographs, Somerset House, London, 10–27 October 2013. With Munem Wasif, Ed Kashi, and Chris Jordan.
AOP50: Images that Defined the Age.

Collections
Norfolk's work is held in the following public collections:
Museum of Fine Arts, Houston, Texas.
Tate Modern, London.
International Center of Photography (ICP)
Metropolitan Museum of Art, New York.
Henry Art Gallery, University of Washington, Seattle.
National Media Museum, Bradford, UK.
San Francisco Museum of Modern Art.
Amon Carter Museum of American Art, Fort Worth, Texas.
Los Angeles County Museum of Art, California 
Wolverhampton Art Gallery, UK.
Saint Louis Art Museum, Missouri.
Nelson-Atkins Museum of Art, Kansas City, Missouri.
Cleveland Museum of Art, Ohio.
Milwaukee Art Museum, Wisconsin.
Portland Art Museum, Oregon.
George Eastman Museum, Rochester, New York.
Hyman Collection, London.

References

External links

Living people
Nigerian photographers
1963 births
Artists from Lagos
Alumni of the University of Wales, Newport
20th-century Nigerian artists
20th-century British photographers
21st-century British photographers
21st-century Nigerian artists
Photographers from Sussex